Meremäe (also known as Mihailova, Mihailovo) is a village in Setomaa Parish, Võru County, southeastern Estonia. The biggest settlements nearby include Vastseliina ( west), town of Võru ( northwest) and Russian town Pechory ( northeast). As of 2011 Census, the village's population was 146.

There are primary school, library and a society centre operating in Meremäe.

Meremäe is also home to archaeological monument no. 13598, Uusvada ludimägi.

References

External links
Meremäe Parish 

Villages in Võru County